"Who Dat" is the lead single released from JT Money's debut album, Pimpin' on Wax. It features a verse from rapper Solé.

Produced by Christopher "Tricky" Stewart (His first produced single), "Who Dat" became a huge hit, making it to number 5 on the Billboard Hot 100 and to date is JT Money's only solo hit. On September 30, 1999, "Who Dat" was certified Gold by the RIAA; it ultimately sold 900,000 copies.

Later in the year, JT Money, Solé and Stewart collaborated on another top-40 single entitled, "4, 5, 6", which appeared on Solé's album, Skin Deep.

Single track listing

A-Side
"Who Dat" (Main Mix)- 3:54  
"Who Dat" (Instrumental)- 3:54

B-Side
"Who Dat" (Clean Mix)- 3:54  
"Who Dat" (Accapella)- 3:54  
"Pimp Matrimony" (Interlude)- 1:43

Charts and certifications

Weekly charts

Year-end charts

Certifications

|}

References

1999 songs
1999 debut singles
Solé songs
Song recordings produced by Tricky Stewart
Priority Records singles